The 1999 UIAA Climbing World Championships, the 5th edition, were held in Birmingham, United Kingdom from 2 to 3 December 1999. It was organized by the Union Internationale des Associations d'Alpinisme (UIAA). The championships consisted of lead and speed events.

Medalists

Lead 
In men's lead, Bernardino Lagni triumphed over Yuji Hirayama who took silver and Maksym Petrenko who took bronze.

In women's lead, Liv Sansoz won and defended her title. Muriel Sarkany took silver and Elena Ovtchinnikova took bronze.

Speed 
In men's speed, Vladimir Zakharov triumphed over Vladimir Netsvetaev-Dolgalev who took silver and Alexei Gadeev who took bronze.

In women's speed, Olga Zakharova triumphed over Olena Ryepko who took silver and Natalia Novikova who took bronze.

References 

 IFSC Climbing World Championships
World Climbing Championships